Russian Embassy School in Algiers (Средняя общеобразовательная школа при Посольстве России в Алжире) is a Russian international school in Algiers, Algeria. It teaches up to the secondary level.

References

External links

 Russian Embassy School in Algiers 

Algiers
International schools in Algeria
Russian international schools
Educational institutions with year of establishment missing